Abbottella calliotropis is a species of operculate land snail, a terrestrial gastropod mollusc in the family Pomatiidae.

Distribution
The distribution of Abbottella calliotropis is restricted to the Caribbean island of Hispaniola.

References

Pomatiidae
Gastropods described in 2013